is a railway station on the Iida Line in the city of Komagane, Nagano Prefecture, Japan, operated by Central Japan Railway Company (JR Central).

Lines
Ōtagiri Station is served by the Iida Line and is 167.0 kilometers from the starting point of the line at Toyohashi Station.

Station layout
The station consists of one ground-level side platform serving one bi-directional track. There is no station building, but only a shelter built on the platform. The station is unattended.

Adjacent stations

History
Ōtagiri Station opened as a provisional stop on 31 October 1914. It was closed with the nationalization of the Ina Electric Railway on 1 August 1943, and reopened as a JNR passenger station on 1 September 1946. With the privatization of Japanese National Railways (JNR) on 1 April 1987, the station came under the control of JR Central.

Passenger statistics
In fiscal 2015, the station was used by an average of 97 passengers daily (boarding passengers only).

Surrounding area

Nagano College of Nursing

See also
 List of railway stations in Japan

References

External links

 Ōtagiri Station information  

Railway stations in Nagano Prefecture
Railway stations in Japan opened in 1946
Stations of Central Japan Railway Company
Iida Line
Komagane, Nagano